Rubens Osvaldo Jesús Udaquiola Laport (born August 12, 1956, in Juan Lacaze, Uruguay) is a Uruguayan-Argentine actor and UNHCR Goodwill Ambassador. In 2000, he earned Martín Fierro Award for his portrayal in television comedy Campeones de la Vida.

Career 
Osvaldo Laport was born in Juan Lacaze, Uruguay, from Rubens Sixto and Teresa Natividad. He worked at several casual jobs during his youth. His brother Luis Udaquiola was detained and tortured, suspected of being linked to the guerrilla group Tupamaros. He moved to Buenos Aires in 1976 and started to study drama at Luis Tasca's Drama School. In order to support his acting classes and pay his room in a hotel downtown he had to work in some jobs as clown, warehouse employee and bricklayer. In 1979, he met Viviana Sáez in the same school, whom he married the following year (they have one daughter, Jazmín, born in 1995).

Then, Osvaldo's drama teacher, Luis Tasca, called him for to work in the play Adiós Juventud. His acting performance got the attention of Santiago Doria, who offered him the leading role in Oscar Wilde's The Importance of Being Earnest, another important play in Argentina. In 1983, Luis Tasca supported Osvaldo again for him get a bit part in the soap opera Cara a Cara, starring Verónica Castro. His works in TV during the 1980s brought him success and in 1990 he was cast in a leading role opposite Jeanette Rodríguez in the remake of Pobre diabla.

The following year, he had his first work as a lead actor in Cosecharás Tu Siembra, with Luisa Kuliok. The role was initially meant for Víctor Laplace, who resigned. His major achievement was a Martin Fierro Award (1999/2000) as Best Actor in a Comedy for his performance as Guido Guevara in Campeones de la Vida.

In 2006, Laport became UNHCR Goodwill Ambassador.

He played Martín Fierro in the television sitcom Son de Fierro (2007–2008). Other than the name, the character has no relation with the famous Martín Fierro poem.

In 2009, Laport was the first Goodwill Ambassador to visit internally displaced camps and urban refugees in the Democratic Republic of Congo. The trip had an extensive coverage in the media and a prime-time TV documentary shown in Argentina and Uruguay.

Filmography

Television
 Cara a Cara (1983) as Bruno
 Lucía Bonelli (1984) as Eduardo
 Duro Como la Roca... Frágil Como el Cristal (1985)
 Amor Prohibido (1986)
 Tu Mundo y el Mío (1987)
 Estrellita Mía (1987) as Miguel Ángel
 Ella Contra Mí (1988) as Roberto
 Pasiones (1988) as Juan
 Pobre diabla (1990) as Ariel Mejía Guzmán
 Cosecharás Tu Siembra (1991) as Luca Vanzini
 Más Allá del Horizonte (1994) as Catriel
 El día que me quieras (1994) as Lucho
 El Último Verano (1996) as Diego Morán
 90-60-90 modelos (1996) as Martín Lescano
 Milady, la Historia Continúa (1997) as  Federico De Valladares
 Susana Giménez (1998)
 Campeones de la Vida (1999) as Guido Guevara
 Franco Buenaventura, el Profe (2002) as Franco Buenaventura
 Soy Gitano (2003) as Amador Heredia
 Amor en Custodia (2005) as Juan Manuel Aguirre
 Brujas (2005) as Vicente Soler
 Collar De Esmeraldas (2006) as Martín Rivera
 Son de Fierro (2007–2008) as Martín Fierro

Film
 Maldita Cocaína - Cacería en Punta del Este (2001) as Danny Fusco
 Sólo un Ángel (2005) as Gonzalo Ruben

Awards 
 Martín Fierro Awards
2000: Best Actor in Comedy (Campeones de la Vida) - Won
2005: Best Actor in Comedy (Amor en custodia) - Won
2006: Best Actor in telenovela (Collar de Esmeraldas) - Nominated
2007: Best Actor in Comedy (Son de Fierro) - Nominated
2013: Best actor of daily comedy (Mis amigos de siempre) - Nominated

References

External links 
 

1956 births
Living people
People from Juan Lacaze
Uruguayan male television actors
Argentine male television actors
United Nations High Commissioner for Refugees Goodwill Ambassadors
Uruguayan male film actors
Uruguayan people of French descent
Uruguayan emigrants to Argentina
Argentine male stage actors
21st-century Argentine male actors
21st-century Uruguayan male actors
20th-century Argentine male actors
20th-century Uruguayan male actors
Participants in Argentine reality television series
Bailando por un Sueño (Argentine TV series) participants